Jeongbalsan is a station on the Seoul Subway Line 3 in Goyang, Gyeonggi Province. It is named after a large park of the same name, adjacent to the northeastern side of the station. On the other side of the park lies the National Cancer Center of Korea. The District Office of Ilsandong-gu is located outside Exit 4.

Station layout

Vicinity
Exit 1: Lake Park
Exit 2: Lotte Department Store La Festa shops and restaurants
Exit 3: Goyang Office of Education
Exit 4: Ilsandong District Office, Jeongbal Middle School

Very close to the station are two large shopping areas called "La Festa' and "Western Dom."

References 

Seoul Metropolitan Subway stations
Railway stations opened in 1996
Metro stations in Goyang
Seoul Subway Line 3